Agrostis alba  may refer to:
 Agrostis gigantea, a grass species
 Poa nemoralis, a grass species